Tissa Wewa is a reservoir in Tissamaharama, thought to have been constructed in the 3rd century BC, either by Mahanaga of Ruhuna or his successor Yatala Tissa of Ruhuna, in order to irrigate paddy lands and supply water to the flourishing city of Tissamaharama.

The lake was restored in 1871. The embankment (or bund) on the southern shore supports the Tissa-Kataragama road (B464), which is lined by old Indian rain trees planted by the British to provide shade.

References 

Reservoirs in Sri Lanka
Bodies of water of Hambantota District
Lakes of Sri Lanka